Macroplea mutica is a species of leaf beetles of the subfamily Donaciinae. It considered to be a Palearctic species, but can be found in Central Europe and Turkey.

Discovery
The species were first discovered by Johan Christian Fabricius in 1792, in Eastern Anatolia. Throughout time, the species have been discovered in South England and Ireland, and also, in countries of Central Europe, such as: North Germany, and Hungary. The species were also found in Scandinavia, especially in countries like Sweden, and Finland.

Description
Adults size is 4.5–6 mm, but could extend up to 7 mm. Prothorax much narrowed to the base, mostly with two or three longitudinal black spots. The vertex angle of elytron is extended in a triangular spine.

Distribution
The beetle lives in Baltic, Mediterranean, and Caspian Seas. Some of the species were discovered on Lake Balaton, in Hungary, which were apparently relatives of the Baltic Sea species.

Threat level
The species is on mixed level of danger. In Poland it considered to be critically endangered, while at the same time, in Germany, is considered to be on an Endangered species list. In Sweden and Finland, though, no decline have been recorded, so the species are not in any danger there at all.

Ecology
Adult beetles are grazing on the leaves of pondweed (Potamogeton) and Ruppia (Ruppiaceae).

References

Beetles of Europe
Beetles described in 1792
Taxa named by Johan Christian Fabricius
Donaciinae